United Western Financial Center is a 357 ft (109m) tall high-rise office building located at 700 17th Street in the city Denver, Colorado. It was completed in 1961 and has 24 floors. It is the 28th tallest building in Denver. It was designed by the architecture firm Raymond Harry Ervin & Associates in the modernist style.

See also
List of tallest buildings in Denver

References
Skyscraperpage
Denver Skyscrapers

Skyscraper office buildings in Denver
Office buildings completed in 1961
Modernist architecture in Colorado